Hui Yuyu (1909 – July 1989) was a People's Republic of China politician. He was the older brother of Zhou Hui, Communist Party of China Committee Secretary of Hunan and Inner Mongolia. He was born in Guannan County, Jiangsu Province. He was two-time governor and CPPCC Committee Chairman of his home province. He was a delegate to the 1st National People's Congress (1954-1959), 2nd National People's Congress (1959-1964) and 3rd National People's Congress (1964-1975).  He was married to Gu Qing.

1909 births
1989 deaths
People's Republic of China politicians from Jiangsu
Chinese Communist Party politicians from Jiangsu
Governors of Jiangsu
Delegates to the 1st National People's Congress
Delegates to the 2nd National People's Congress
Delegates to the 3rd National People's Congress
Delegates to the National People's Congress from Jiangsu
CPPCC Chairmen of Jiangsu
Deputy Communist Party secretaries of Jiangsu
Standing Members of the Jiangsu Party Standing Committee
Politicians from Nanjing
Mayors of Nanjing
Mayors of Suzhou